The 2022 Banja Luka Challenger was a professional tennis tournament played on clay courts. It was the 20th edition of the tournament which was part of the 2022 ATP Challenger Tour. It took place in Banja Luka, Bosnia and Herzegovina from 22 to 28 August 2022.

Singles main-draw entrants

Seeds

 1 Rankings are as of 15 August 2022.

Other entrants
The following players received wildcards into the singles main draw:
  Yevhenii Bondarenko
  Damir Džumhur
  Matvey Minin

The following player received entry into the singles main draw using a protected ranking:
  Jan Choinski

The following player received entry into the singles main draw as an alternate:
  Filip Cristian Jianu

The following players received entry from the qualifying draw:
  Kimmer Coppejans
  Benjamin Hassan
  Aldin Šetkić
  Thiago Seyboth Wild
  Marko Topo
  Alexander Weis

Champions

Singles

 Fábián Marozsán def.  Damir Džumhur 6–2, 6–1.

Doubles

 Vladyslav Manafov /  Oleg Prihodko def.  Fabian Fallert /  Hendrik Jebens 6–3, 6–4.

References

2022 in Bosnia and Herzegovina sport
2022 ATP Challenger Tour
2022
August 2022 sports events in Europe